Maidenhead is a constituency in Berkshire represented in the House of Commons of the Parliament of the United Kingdom. Since its creation at the 1997 general election, the seat has been held by Conservative Member of Parliament Theresa May who served as Home Secretary from 2010 to 2016 and as Prime Minister from 2016 to 2019.

It is considered a safe seat for the Conservative Party.

History 
The constituency was first drawn shortly after the 1992 general election. The electorate of Maidenhead and Windsor was becoming too large, so the Boundary Commission for England separated the seats for the next election, due in 1996 or 1997. It was formed from parts of the abolished safe seat of Windsor and Maidenhead and the constituency of Wokingham. It was first used in the 1997 election. Theresa May, Prime Minister from 2016 to 2019, has held the seat since its creation. In 1995, May, a former London councillor at the time working at the Association for Payment Clearing Services and as a Foreign affairs advisor, was selected to contest the new seat, defeating her future Chancellor of the Exchequer, Philip Hammond, in the selection process. (Hammond was later selected for the nearby seat of Runnymede and Weybridge). May won the seat in the 1997 election, in which over 100 Conservatives lost their seats, and the party obtained its lowest share of seats in 91 years. At the 2010 general election May achieved the 9th highest share of the vote of the 307 seats held by a Conservative.

The closest election in the seat was in 2001, in which May's majority was cut from almost 12,000 votes in 1997 to just 3,284 votes ahead of the Liberal Democrat candidate. The Labour candidate in that election was activist and comedy writer John O'Farrell, whose campaign was the subject of a BBC documentary entitled Losing My Maidenhead.

Due to their strong performance in 2001, the seat was one of several targeted by the Liberal Democrats in 2005 as part of a 'decapitation strategy' to deprive senior Conservatives of their seats; as with similar efforts in Haltemprice and Howden and West Dorset, however, this strategy was unsuccessful: May retained her seat with almost double her 2001 majority. Since then, she has held it with majorities of at least 30%.

Constituency profile 
Housing is, in the Wokingham district part, at the northern end of a belt where more than 40% of dwellings are detached houses, and less than 10.8% are purpose-built flats or tenements (maisonettes) (2011 figures, by district) Reflecting a national trend in this period, the latter band was in 2001 a band of fewer than 8% of housing stock as flats.  The other borough, namely Windsor and Maidenhead, is the district with the most expensive house prices in the country outside of Greater London. The seat is located in the technology-rich M4 corridor, which includes the largest company headquarters estate in Europe at Slough; and though most of the communities have slower links to London than Maidenhead town centre, they instead have close links to Reading and Bracknell. A minority commute to the City of London, which is just under one hour's commute from the two mainline stations. Communities in the area will also benefit from the eventual opening of Crossrail, with trains running direct from Maidenhead and Twyford to the City of London and Stratford. The seat includes the renowned restaurants, the Fat Duck at Bray and the Waterside Inn. There are low hills in the north of the seat and the Chiltern Hills further to the north. Taking the constituent electoral ward results since the decline of the Liberal Party in the 1910s, the area has always been a safe seat for Conservative candidates. One broadsheet political column encapsulated the constituency as a "seat of Thamesside towns", these house a majority of its residents other than Twyford which spans the multi-stream river in the town. The agriculture in the area consists of some pasture, fields of wheat and fruit.

Boundaries

The constituency borders the constituencies of Reading East, Henley, Wycombe, Beaconsfield, Windsor, Bracknell and Wokingham. The seat's largest settlement is the town of Maidenhead in the Royal Borough of Windsor and Maidenhead, Berkshire. It includes the following wards:

1997–2010: The Royal Borough of Windsor and Maidenhead wards of Belmont, Bisham and Cookham, Boyn Hill, Cox Green, Furze Platt, Hurley, Oldfield, Pinkney's Green, and St Mary's (transferred from the abolished constituency of Windsor and Maidenhead); and the District of Wokingham wards of Charvil, Coronation, Hurst, Remenham and Wargrave, Sonning, and Twyford and Ruscombe (transferred from the altered constituency of Wokingham).

2010–present: The Royal Borough of Windsor and Maidenhead wards of Belmont, Bisham and Cookham, Boyn Hill, Bray, Cox Green, Furze Platt, Hurley and Walthams, Maidenhead Riverside, Oldfield, and Pinkney's Green, and the District of Wokingham wards of Charvil, Coronation, Hurst, Remenham, Wargrave and Ruscombe, Sonning, and Twyford.

Bray was transferred from Windsor.

Members of Parliament

Elections

Elections in the 2010s 
:

:

:

:

Elections in the 2000s 
:

:

Elections in the 1990s 
:

See also 
 List of parliamentary constituencies in Berkshire

Notes

References

Parliamentary constituencies in Berkshire
Politics of the Royal Borough of Windsor and Maidenhead
Maidenhead
Theresa May
Constituencies of the Parliament of the United Kingdom established in 1997
Constituencies of the Parliament of the United Kingdom represented by a sitting Prime Minister